Bathyphytophilus is a genus of very small, deep water sea snails, marine gastropod mollusks in the family Bathyphytophilidae, the false limpets.

Species
Species within the genus Bathyphytophilus include:
 Bathyphytophilus caribaeus Moskalev, 1978
 Bathyphytophilus diegensis Haszprunar, G. & J.H. McLean, 1996

References

External links
 To ITIS
 To World Register of Marine Species

Bathyphytophilidae